Simon I of Saarbrücken (died after 1183) was a German nobleman.  He was the second ruling Count of Saarbrücken (de), in office 1135 - 1183.

Life 
Simon was a son of Frederick, Count of Saarbrücken (d. 1135) and his wife Gisela of Lorraine (b.c. 1100), daughter of Theodoric II, Duke of Lorraine.  He succeeded his father as Count of Saarbrücken in 1135.  His younger brother Adalbert II became Archbishop of Mainz in 1138.

After his death, the county was divided.  His eldest son, Simon II inherited a smaller County of Saarbrücken; his younger son Henry I founded the new County of Zweibrücken.

Marriage and issue 
Simon was married to a Mathilda, probably a daughter of Count Meginhard I of Sponheim.  They had the following children together:
 Simon II (de) (d.a. 1207), successor as Count. He married b. 1180 to Liutgard (d.a. 1239), a daughter or other close relative to Emich III, Count of Leiningen. One of their sons was Simon III, another was Friedrich III (d. 1237), who inherited the County of Leiningen.
 Henry I (de) (d. 1228), married Hedwig (d.a. 1228), a daughter of Frederick I, Duke of Lorraine. He became Count of Zweibrücken.
 Frederick (d.b. 1187)
 Gottfried, a canon in Mainz
 Adalbert (d.a. 1210), archdeacon in Mainz
 Jutta (d.b. 1223), married Folmar II, Count of Blieskastel, son of Folmar I (d.a. 1179), and Clementia of Metz.
 Sophie (d.a. 1215), married Henry III, Duke of Limburg (1140-1121)
 Agnes (d.b. 1180), married Günther III, Count of Schwarzburg (d.a. 1197)

External links 
 genealogie-mittelalter.de
 

Counts of Saarbrücken
12th-century births
Year of birth unknown
Year of death unknown
1183 deaths
12th-century German nobility